WWIS may refer to:

 WWIS-FM, a radio station (99.7 FM) licensed to Black River Falls, Wisconsin, United States
 WWIS (AM), a radio station (1260 AM) licensed to Black River Falls, Wisconsin, United States

Broadcast call sign disambiguation pages